Sarah Island may refer to:

Sarah Island (Massachusetts), an island in the U.S. state of Massachusetts
Sarah Island (Tasmania), the remnant site of the Macquarie Harbour Penal Station in Van Diemen's Land (now Tasmania) in Australia
Sarah Island (British Columbia), an island east of Princess Royal Island